The Law of Abode is a law in Greek mythology that is older than Zeus and all are powerless to revoke. The Law of Abode states that if any food or drink should pass through your lips while in the realm of Hades, then you may not go back above to Earth and are forever doomed to stay in the underworld.

When Persephone was kidnapped by Hades, she ate six pomegranate seeds. Had she eaten the entire pomegranate (and thus all the seeds), she would have been condemned to the underworld permanently. Because she only ate half, she was forced to stay in Hades for six months of every year. During the other six months, she was reunited with her mother, Demeter, on the surface world.

Greek mythology